József Hild (born Josef Hild, 8 December 1789 – 6 March 1867) was a Hungarian-German architect. One of the major exponents of neoclassical architecture of the time, he played an important part in the remodelling of Pest during the so-called reform era (early 19th century).

Life and career 
Hild gained an early interest in architecture through his father, also a Bohemian architect, and studied at the Vienna Academy while working for the Esterhazy family. There he worked under Charles de Moreau in Kismarton and Vienna. Following his father's death in 1811, he interrupted his studies but applied to become a master builder which was granted pending he gain further experience. This lead him to travelling to Italy, where he completed further studies in Naples, Rome, Florence and Milan. After returning home in the 1820s he slowly built up a reputation which was to culminate in the rebuilding of Pest following the floods of 1838. In 1844 he became a master builder and from 1845 was appointed city architect of Pest.

Works 
Hild's classicist style contributed greatly to the transformation of Pest in the early 19th century. In his last decades he began to incorporate a broader historicist style, but his best known works are still strongly neoclassicist, particularly the churches.

 Budapest
 Saint Stephen's Basilica plans (completed by Miklos Ybl)
 Lloyd Palace, Roosevelt Square (subsequently demolished & replaced by the Gresham Palace)
 Apartment buildings e.g. Gross (Jozsef nador squ. 1); Karolyi-Trattner (Petofi Sandor str. 3); Derra and Marczibanyi buildings (Oktober 6 str.)
 Villas in Hűvösvölgy: Csendilla, Hild-villa
 Remodelling of Kalvin Square & Kalvin Church following the floods in 1838, then also in 1854–55

 Esztergom
 Basilica, Savings Bank building, Bibliotheca (Library), Seminary

 Eger
 Parish house

 Cegléd
 Reformed Church

References

External links 
 

Hungarian architects
Hungarian-German people
German Bohemian people
Hungarian people of Czech descent
Hungarian people of German descent
Danube-Swabian people
People from Pest, Hungary
1789 births
1867 deaths